Children of the North is a British television thriller drama series, written by John Hale, that first broadcast on BBC2 on 30 October 1991. The series, comprising four episodes, was based on the novel trilogy The Killing of Yesterday's Children, Lonely the Man Without Heroes and A Darkness in the Eye by author M.S. Power. All four episodes were directed by David Drury, with Chris Parr acting as executive producer.

The series starred Patrick Malahide as Colonel Mailer, an MI5 agent whose chauffeur is killed during an IRA assassination attempt on Mailer himself, and Michael Gough as Arthur Apple, a bookie who launders money for the IRA. Notably, the series has never been re-broadcast or released on DVD.

Production
According to a Sydney Morning Herald review, Malahide's character is "nearing retirement from a shattering life in military intelligence". Tony Doyle, Adrian Dunbar ,and John Kavanagh co-starred alongside Malahide and Gough. The original BBC plotline for the series read; "When two MI6 officers are shot dead in an unmarked car, assassination attempts, money laundering operations and peace talks follow as hitman Martin Deeley (Adrian Dunbar) is simultaneously chased by members of the IRA, the RUC ,and the army".

Behind-the-scenes production photos were later uploaded on social media website Pinterest by the owner of the land where part of the series was filmed.

Cast
 Patrick Malahide as Colonel Mailer; a military intelligence operative
 Michael Gough as Arthur Apple; a bookie who launders money for the IRA
 Tony Doyle as John Axton; an RUC Special Branch officer
 John Kavanagh as Seamus Reilly; an IRA 'godfather'
 Adrian Dunbar as Martin Deeley; a career hitman

Recurring
 Paul Brooke as Ballister
 Jonathan Hyde as Colonel Shrapnel
 Ian McElhinney as O'Hare
 Sean Caffrey as IRA Chief of Staff
 John Hewitt as Moran
 Frankie McCafferty as Fergal
 Brian McGrath as McIlliver
 Tony Byrne as Dowling

Episodes

References

External links

1991 British television series debuts
1991 British television series endings
1990s British drama television series
BBC television dramas
British thriller television series
Television in Northern Ireland
1990s British television miniseries
Television shows based on novels
English-language television shows
Television shows set in Northern Ireland
Films directed by David Drury